Emma Louise Merry (born 2 July 1974) is a female retired English discus thrower.

Athletics career
Merry placed third in the discus at the 1999 and 2000 AAA Championships. She finished seventh representing England at the 1998 Commonwealth Games in Kuala Lumpur.

Her personal best throw was 57.75 metres, achieved in August 1999 in Wrexham. This places her ninth on the British outdoor all-time list, behind Meg Ritchie, Venissa Head, Philippa Roles, Shelley Newman, Jackie McKernan, Debbie Callaway, Tracy Axten and Rosemary Payne.

She competed internationally in her youth and represented Great Britain at the World Junior Championships in Athletics in 1990 and 1992, and at the European Athletics Junior Championships in 1991 and 1993.

At the English Schools Athletics Championships she won the junior category in 1988, the intermediate titles in 1989 and 1990, and three straight senior titles from 1991 to 1993 (her final title included a championship record of ). She was the 1989 winner at the British Schools International Match and the 1996 winner of the British Universities Athletics Championships.

International competitions

References

External links

1974 births
Living people
British female discus throwers
English female discus throwers
Commonwealth Games competitors for England
Athletes (track and field) at the 1998 Commonwealth Games